AAAM may refer to
Association for the Advancement of Automotive Medicine
AIM-152 AAAM - long range missile